Shannon Elizabeth Woeller (born January 31, 1990) is a Canadian soccer defender who plays for IF Brommapojkarna in the Damallsvenskan.

College career
Woeller played high school soccer for Prince of Wales Secondary School in her native city. She then went to Rutgers University, where she played from 2009 to 2013.

Club career
While still at school and college, Woeller played for Vancouver Whitecaps FC and Seattle Sounders in the W-League In the spring of 2014, she left North America and signed with Norwegian Toppserien club IK Grand Bodø. In 2015, she went to play at Stjarnan, at Iceland top-tier league. On January 26, 2017, Woeller signed up with FF USV Jena, where she replaced countrywoman Rachel Melhado, after more than a year without a club.

After FF USV Jena was relegated from the Frauen-Bundesliga following their last place finish in the 2017–2018 season, Woeller announced she was joining Eskilstuna United DFF in the Damallsvenskan in Sweden.

International career
Woeller was 15 years old, when she was called for coach Lewis Page to a Canadian U15 camp. In 2008, she was part of the team that won the 2008 CONCACAF Women's U-20 Championship in Mexico. In the same year, Woeller was included in the 21-players squad that represented Canada at the 2008 FIFA U-20 Women's World Cup. On March 7, 2009 she made her debut for Canadian senior team in a match against Netherlands at the 2009 Cyprus Cup. In 2010, Woeller was part of the group that played at 2010 CONCACAF Women's U-20 Championship and finished fourth, failing to qualify for the 2010 FIFA U-20 Women's World Cup in Germany. In 2011, she was included by coach John Herdman in the 18-players squad that represented Canada at the 2011 Pan American Games in Mexico. The team concluded its participation in the competition, winning the gold medal in a match against Brazil. In 2012, Woeller was in the 20-players squad that played at the 2012 CONCACAF Women's Olympic Qualifying Tournament. The tournament was held in her native city and Canada qualified for the women's tournament at the Olympic Games. Although, she was not part of the final 18 players who represented Canada in London.

Following her call-up in March 2012, Woeller would not receive another call-up to the Canadian senior team for almost five years. She was called up for a friendly on April 9, 2017 against the German national team in Erfurt, Germany. She was also named to Canada's squad for the 2018 Algarve Cup.

On May 25, 2019 she was named to the roster for the 2019 FIFA Women's World Cup.

Personal life
Woeller is great granddaughter of the Canadian former ice hockey player Beattie Ramsay and granddaughter of Archdeacon David John Woeller.

References

External links
 Player's Profile at Scarlet Knights
 
 Player's Profile at Vancouver Whitecaps FC
 
 

1990 births
Rutgers Scarlet Knights women's soccer players
Vancouver Whitecaps FC (women) players
Canada women's international soccer players
Living people
Stjarnan women's football players
Seattle Sounders Women players
Soccer players from Vancouver
FF USV Jena players
Canadian women's soccer players
Women's association football defenders
2019 FIFA Women's World Cup players
Eskilstuna United DFF players
Damallsvenskan players
Pan American Games medalists in football
Pan American Games gold medalists for Canada
Footballers at the 2011 Pan American Games
Canadian expatriate sportspeople in Spain
Canadian expatriate sportspeople in Germany
Medalists at the 2011 Pan American Games
Canadian expatriate sportspeople in Sweden
Canadian expatriate sportspeople in Norway
Canadian expatriate sportspeople in Iceland
Canadian expatriate sportspeople in the United States
Canadian expatriate women's soccer players
Expatriate women's footballers in Spain
Expatriate women's footballers in Germany
Expatriate women's footballers in Sweden
Expatriate women's footballers in Iceland
Expatriate women's footballers in Norway
Expatriate women's soccer players in the United States